Kallelibhagom  is a village in Kollam district in the state of Kerala, India.

Demographics- Census Data 2011

External links 
Census in India

References

Villages in Kollam district